Conus platensis is an extinct species of sea snail, a marine gastropod mollusk in the family Conidae, the cone snails and their allies.

Description
The size of the shell attains 23 mm.

Distribution
This species was found as a fossil off Platense de Punta Carreta, Montevideo, Uruguay

References

 Frenguelli, J., 1946. Especies del Género Conus. Notas del Museo. Paleontología, Paleont.. 11 (88 ): 231 -250

External links
 The Conus Biodiversity website
 Malacolog: Conus platensis

platensis